The Ministry of the Interior is a government department of Greece. On 15 September 1995, it was merged with the Ministry of the Prime Minister's Office to form the Ministry of the Interior, Public Administration and Decentralization. On 19 September 2007, it was merged with the Ministry of Public Order and reverted to its original name. The merger was reversed on 7 October 2009, when the Ministry of the Interior, Decentralization and Electronic Governance was formed. On 27 June 2011, a separate Ministry of Administrative Reform and Electronic Governance was created, and the Ministry of the Interior again reverted to its original name. On 27 January 2015, the two were merged with the Ministry of Public Order and Citizen Protection to form the Ministry of the Interior and Administrative Reorganization. A separate Ministry of Administrative Reorganization was created on 5 November 2016, and the Ministry of the Interior reverted to its original name for the third time in a decade. A separate Ministry of Citizen Protection was also re-established on 29 August 2018. The Ministry of Administrative Reorganization was reabsorbed by the Ministry of the Interior on 9 July 2019.

List of Ministers of the Interior (1974–1995)

On 15 September 1995, the Ministry of the Prime Minister's Office and the Ministry of the Interior were merged to become the Ministry of the Interior, Public Administration and Decentralization.

List of Ministers of the Interior, Public Administration and Decentralization (1995–2007)

 On 19 September 2007, the Ministry of the Interior, Public Administration and Decentralization was merged with the Ministry of Public Order to form the Ministry of the Interior.

List of Ministers of the Interior (2007–2009)

List of Ministers of the Interior, Decentralization and Electronic Governance (2009–2011)

List of Ministers of the Interior (2011–2015)

List of Ministers of the Interior and Administrative Reorganization (2015–2016)

List of Ministers of the Interior (since 2016)

See also
Decentralization

External links
Official website 

Government ministries of Greece
Lists of government ministers of Greece
Law enforcement in Greece
Greece